The Statue of Urban VIII is a large statue from the late 1630s, of the then pope Urban VIII. It was executed by Gian Lorenzo Bernini and his workshop. The work was commissioned in 1635 and took five years to complete. The piece sits in the Palazzo dei Conservatori in Rome.

See also
List of works by Gian Lorenzo Bernini

Notes

References

Further reading
 Mezzatesta, Michael P. and Rudolf Preimesberger, Bernini, Grove Art Online.
 Mormando, Franco, Bernini: His Life and His Rome, Chicago, London: University of Chicago Press, 2011.

External links

Pope Urban VIII
Sculptures by Gian Lorenzo Bernini
Sculptures of popes